Buddleja thyrsoides is a lowland species endemic from southern Paraguay to the deltas of the Río de la Plata and Paraná River in Brazil, Argentina and Uruguay. The species was first described and named by Lamarck in 1792.<ref name=Lam.>Lamarck, J-B. (1792). Tabl. encycl. 1: 291, 1792</ref>

DescriptionBuddleja thyrsoides is a dioecious shrub 1 – 3. m tall, with tan bark, the young branches covered with white tomentum. The leaves are sessile or subsessile,  linear or linear-lanceolate, the blade 7 – 15 cm long by 0.4 – 3 cm wide, subcoriaceous, glabrescent above, and white tomentose below. The fragrant white leafy inflorescences are 5 – 15 cm long by 2 – 3 cm wide, comprising 1 – 2 orders of branches, 0.5 – 2 cm long  with cymose clusters of 5 – 15 flowers; the tubular corollas 3 – 4 mm long.

Subspecies
Norman identifies two subspecies distinguished by narrower seeds and denser tomentum resp.:
 Buddleja thyrsoides subsp. angusticarpa Buddleja thyrsoides subsp. thyrsoides (synonyms= Buddleja chloroleuca Kraenzl., Buddleja salicifolia'' Vahl.)

Cultivation
Neither the species nor its subspecies are known to be in cultivation.

References

thyrsoides
Flora of Argentina
Flora of Brazil
Flora of Paraguay
Flora of Uruguay
Flora of South America
Dioecious plants